Elbert Crouse Farmstead is a historic home and farm located near Whitehead, Alleghany County, North Carolina. The farmhouse was built about 1905, and is a small log dwelling with a traditional two-room plan and an attic under a steeply pitched gable roof.  Also on the property is a contributing frame barn, dated to the 1920s or 1930s, a small shed storage building with vertical board siding, a latticed gable roof structure that was originally a grave cover, a concrete block silo, the ruins of a small frame outbuilding, and the family cemetery. The Elbert Crouse Farmstead is representative of the small subsistence family farms in Western North Carolina.

It was listed on the National Register of Historic Places in 1982.

References

Log houses in the United States
Farms on the National Register of Historic Places in North Carolina
Houses completed in 1905
Houses in Alleghany County, North Carolina
National Register of Historic Places in Alleghany County, North Carolina
Log buildings and structures on the National Register of Historic Places in North Carolina
1905 establishments in North Carolina